In the mathematical discipline of ergodic theory, a Sinai–Ruelle–Bowen (SRB) measure is an invariant measure that behaves similarly to, but is not an ergodic measure. In order to be ergodic, the time average would need to be equal the space average for almost all initial states , with  being the phase space. For an SRB measure , it suffices that the ergodicity condition be valid for initial states in a set  of positive Lebesgue measure.

The initial ideas pertaining to SRB measures were introduced by Yakov Sinai, David Ruelle and Rufus Bowen in the less general area of Anosov diffeomorphisms and axiom A attractors.

Definition

Let  be a map.

for every  and every continuous function .

Existence of SRB measures

The following theorem establishes sufficient conditions for the existence of SRB measures. It considers the case of Axiom A attractors, which is simpler, but it has been extended times to more general scenarios.

Theorem 1: Let  be a  diffeomorphism with an Axiom A attractor . Assume that this attractor is irreducible, that is, it is not the union of two other sets that are also invariant under .
  is an SRB measure;
  has absolutely continuous measures conditioned on the unstable manifold and submanifolds thereof;
Also, in these conditions  is a measure-preserving dynamical system.

It has also been proved that the above are equivalent to stating that  equals the zero-noise limit stationary distribution of a Markov chain with states . That is, consider that to each point  is associated a transition probability  with noise level  that measures the amount of uncertainty of the next state, in a way such that:

where  is the Dirac measure. The zero-noise limit is the stationary distribution of this Markov chain when the noise level approaches zero. The importance of this is that it states mathematically that the SRB measure is a "good" approximation to practical cases where small amounts of noise exist, though nothing can be said about the amount of noise that is tolerable.

See also

 Quasi-invariant measure
 Krylov–Bogolyubov theorem
 Gibbs measure

Notes

References

Ergodic theory